Kosa (Kös) is a rural locality (a selo) and the administrative center of Kosinsky District, Perm Krai, Russia. The population was 2,383 as of 2010. There are 23 streets.

References 

Rural localities in Kosinsky District